Isabella of Savoy (11 March 1591 – 28 August 1626)  was a daughter of Charles Emmanuel I, Duke of Savoy, and Catherine Michelle of Spain.  Her maternal grandparents were Philip II of Spain and Elisabeth of Valois, her paternal grandparents were Emmanuel Philibert, Duke of Savoy and Margaret of France, Duchess of Berry. She was the Hereditary Princess of Modena, dying before her husband succeeded to the Duchy of Modena in 1628.

Life

Isabella was born in Turin to Charles Emmanuel I, Duke of Savoy and his wife Infanta Catherine Michelle of Spain, a daughter of Philip II of Spain and Elisabeth of France.

Marriage
On 22 February 1608, she married Alfonso, Hereditary Prince of Modena (son of Cesare d'Este and Virginia de' Medici) in Turin. This was a happy marriage; Alfonso was loving and loyal towards his wife. Within two years, Isabella bore Alfonso a son, Francesco who would one day succeed his father as Duke of Modena and Reggio. 

When Isabella died in childbirth on 28 August 1626, Alfonso was heartbroken; he never remarried and died in 1644. Isabella had been constantly pregnant during much of her 18 years of marriage, giving birth almost once per year. She had died before her husband became duke, so she was never Duchess of Modena.

Issue

Isabella and Alfonso had fourteen children in just seventeen years:
Cesare d'Este (1609–1613), died in infancy;
Francesco d'Este (1610–1658), future Duke of Modena; married Maria Farnese, Vittoria Farnese d'Este and Lucrezia Barberini, all had issue;
Obizzo d'Este (1611–1644), Bishop of Modena;
Caterina d'Este (1613–1628), nun;
Cesare d'Este (1614–1677), died unmarried;;
Alessandro d'Este (1615), died in infancy;;
Carlo Alessandro d'Este (1616–1679), died unmarried;;
Rinaldo d'Este (1618–1672) Cardinal;
Margherita d'Este (1619–1692), married Ferrante III Gonzaga, duca di Guastalla;
Beatrice d'Este (1620), died in infancy;
Beatrice d'Este (1622–1623), died in infancy;
Filiberto d'Este (1623–1645);
Bonifazio d'Este (1624), died in infancy;
Anna Beatrice d'Este (1626–1690), married Alessandro II Pico della Mirandola and had issue; Isabella died giving birth to her.

Ancestry

References

Princesses of Savoy
1591 births
1626 deaths
Nobility from Turin
Deaths in childbirth
House of Este
Hereditary Princesses of Modena
17th-century Italian nobility
17th-century Italian women
Daughters of monarchs